James M. Gardiner (born April 17, 1976) is a Chicago politician and firefighter who serves as the alderman for the 45th ward in the Chicago City Council. 

Elected to the Chicago City Council in 2019, Gardiner identified as a political independent; however, he would later switch to the Democratic Party and serve as the 45th Ward Democratic Committeeperson. He supports low taxes, the legalization of marijuana, few gun restrictions, and has a mixed record on immigration. 

During his tenure, Gardiner has been sued for abuse of power and has received controversy for disparaging comments he made about a female staffer of another alderman.

Background
Gardiner was born on April 17, 1976 to Irish immigrant parents, the youngest of 7 children. He graduated from Notre Dame High School and from Saint Xavier University in 2002 with a degree in teaching. Gardiner is a firefighter with the Chicago Fire Department, but has taken a leave of absence.

Political career
In the February 2019 Chicago City Council election, Gardiner defeated incumbent John Arena, obtaining 50.9% of the vote to Arena's 36.2%.  Gardiner was elected to the 45th Ward Democratic Committeeperson position in March 2020, defeating challenger Ellen Hill by 292 votes.

Gardiner is a member of the Democratic Party, but identified as an independent before 2019.  Gardiner believes in the legalization and taxation of recreational marijuana. Gardiner is not in favor of an increase in property taxes, municipal taxes, and real estate transfer taxes. He is also not in favor of the LaSalle Street Tax. Gardiner does not believe stricter gun control laws will reduce the amount of illegal firearms, but believes educating the youth on the dangers of illegal guns will help reduce gun violence. When campaigning, Gardiner said he believes in keeping Chicago a sanctuary city, and preventing the Chicago Police Department from detaining illegal immigrants, however, on January 27, 2021, Gardiner was one of eight Aldermen to vote against strengthening the City's Welcoming City ordinance.

In the 2023 aldermanic election, Gardiner faced five challengers. Prior to the election, Axios noted that Gardiner could be helped by re-districting that makes his district more conservative. The Chicago Tribune endorsed Megan Mathias in the election. In the general election, Gardiner received 48% of the votes,  resulting in a runoff between him and Mathias, who was second place and received 16.86% of the vote. The runoff election is scheduled for April 4.

Controversies
According to Axios, Gardiner is the "most controversial alder in the council."

In November 2020, Gardiner was sued for alleged abuse of power and false arrest of a ward resident. Gardiner's co-defendants include 45th Ward Superintendent Charles Sikanich and seven Chicago police officers. The lawsuit alleges that Gardiner used his capacity as an alderman to have a construction worker arrested after he found a ward workers cell phone that was mistakenly left at a 7-Eleven; in March 2022, a federal judge green lighted the lawsuit to continue.  Federal officials are investigating allegations that Gardiner has taken bribes and demanded payments for actions.

In September 2021, exposed private text messages between Gardiner and Alderman Scott Waguespack revealed Gardiner using disparaging and misogynistic language to describe Waguespack's female chief of staff. The comments were condemned by many Chicago political leaders, including Mayor Lori Lightfoot. Gardiner apologized for the statements.

See also
List of Chicago aldermen since 1923

References

1976 births
American firefighters
Chicago City Council members
Living people
Illinois Independents
21st-century American politicians